The Best of A1 is the first compilation album by British-Norwegian boyband A1. The album was released on 9 August 2004 exclusively in Asia. The album contained two discs, the first comprising eighteen audio tracks, and the second with seven live performances. The album contained six postcards, and was packaged in a cardboard slipcase.

Track listing

References

2004 greatest hits albums
A1 (band) albums
2004 live albums
2004 video albums
Live video albums
Sony BMG compilation albums